Pınarbaşı railway station is a railway station in Aşağıpınarbaşı, Turkey. TCDD Taşımacılık operates a daily inter-city train from İzmir to Konya which stops at the station in the evening and in the early morning.

The Polatlı-Konya high-speed railway bypasses the station, but does not stop there. Trains that stop at Pınarbaşı are all on the Eskişehir-Konya railway.

References

External links
TCDD Taşımacılık
Turkish State Railways
Turkish train timetables

Railway stations in Konya Province